Davis Branch is a stream in Montgomery County in the U.S. state of Missouri. It is a tributary of the Loutre River.

Davis Branch was named for the fact two families named Davis settled the area.

See also
List of rivers of Missouri

References

Rivers of Montgomery County, Missouri
Rivers of Missouri